Astro Sensasi - which means 'Sensation' in Malay, is the first and only dedicated Malay channel that showcases a large variety of programmes ranging from dramas, movies, entertainment and variety, documentaries to other magazine programmes.

Sensasi started its 24 hour broadcast in 2013.

History
August 7, 2007
Sensasi started as the first Malay language cable television channel in Singapore with a 6-hour broadcasts from 7:00 pm to 1:00 am.

August 8, 2007
Sensasi started the 18-hour broadcasts from 7:00 am to 1:00 am.

May 1, 2013
Sensasi revamped the broadcast to 24 hours instead of 18 hours of broadcast.

April 28‚ 2022
Hub Sensasi has changed to Astro Sensasi. Astro Sensasi started Indonesian programming as well as Malaysian programming. It is currently owned by Astro.

External links 
Starhub CableTV

References 

StarHub Launches Sensasi

2007 establishments in Singapore
Television stations in Singapore
Mass media in Singapore
Malay language television stations
Television channels and stations established in 2007